Lin Fan (born January 30, 1987) is a retired wushu taolu athlete from China.

Career 
Lin's first major international appearance was at the 2007 World Wushu Championships in Beijing, China, where she won the first gold medal of the competition in nanquan. A year later, Lin was selected to compete at the 2008 Beijing Wushu Tournament and won the gold medal in women's nanquan. At the 2009 World Games in Kaohsiung, Taiwan, she won in the women's nanquan and nandao combined event and a year later, won in the same event at the 2010 Asian Games in Gunagzhou. Her last competition was at the 2011 World Wushu Championships in Ankara, Turkey where she was the world champion in nanquan.

See also 

 List of Asian Games medalists in wushu
 China national wushu team

References

External links 

 Athlete profile at the 2008 Beijing Wushu Tournament

1987 births
Living people
Sportspeople from Fujian
Chinese wushu practitioners
Competitors at the 2008 Beijing Wushu Tournament
Wushu practitioners at the 2010 Asian Games
Medalists at the 2010 Asian Games
Asian Games medalists in wushu
Asian Games gold medalists for China
Competitors at the 2009 World Games
World Games medalists in wushu